NFL Europe League (simply called NFL Europe and known in its final season as NFL Europa League) was a professional American football league that functioned as the developmental minor league of the National Football League (NFL). Originally founded in 1989 as the World League of American Football (or WLAF), the league was envisioned as a transatlantic league encompassing teams from both North America and Europe. Initially, the WLAF consisted of seven teams in North America and three in Europe. It began play in 1991 and lasted for two seasons before suspending operations; while the league had been "wildly popular" in Europe, it failed to achieve success in North America. After a two-year hiatus, it returned as a six-team European league, with teams based in England, Germany, the Netherlands, Scotland, and Spain. NFL Europa was dissolved in 2007 due to its continued unprofitability and the NFL's decision to shift its focus towards hosting regular-season games in Europe; at the time of its closure, the league consisted of five German teams and one team based in the Netherlands.

The league operated under rules nearly identical to the NFL, but featured some differences and experimental rules changes designed to appeal to fans of association football (soccer) and rugby football. NFL teams were incentivized to allocate players through the granting of additional training camp positions for each allocated player, and each team in NFL Europe was required to employ a number of "local" players. Most of the league's players were American, with "local" players tending to be converted rugby or soccer players playing at the punter or placekicker positions. Several NFL Europe alumni – including quarterbacks Brad Johnson, Kurt Warner, and Jake Delhomme – went on to have successful careers in the NFL, and two NFL Europe alumni (Adam Vinatieri and Dante Hall) made the National Football League 2000s All-Decade Team.

The league's schedule went through several formats throughout its existence, but each season always culminated in the championship World Bowl game. In its initial run, each team played a ten-game schedule, and the winners of each of the three divisions (Europe, North America East, and North America West), along with the team with the best record that didn't win a division, would play in a four-team playoff. Following its revival as a six-team European league, the ten-game schedule was retained as double round-robin regular season. From 1995 to 1997, the World Bowl was played between the team with the best record in the first half of the season and the team with the best record in the second half of the season; from 1998 on, the two teams with the best records across the entire season played in the World Bowl. The Frankfurt Galaxy – the only team to play all 15 seasons of the league's existence – won the most World Bowl titles (four) and recorded the most World Bowl appearances (eight), while the final league title was won by the Hamburg Sea Devils.

History

Founding and origins

In 1974, the National Football League (NFL) announced plans to launch a professional American football league in Europe, the Intercontinental Football League (IFL). Aiming for a launch in the spring of 1975, the IFL would feature six  teams (located in Istanbul, Rome, Munich, Berlin, Vienna, and Barcelona, respectively) and would be a satellite league of the NFL, with initial funds made by the NFL owners and the rosters consisting of "second-line athletes and rookies from established NFL teams". The brainchild of Bob Kap, the proposed league had already sold six franchises and had secured the rights to loan players from the NFL. The league had also pre-selected four more cities for expansion teams, and Al Davis and Tex Schramm were assigned to head the committee that would put the league together. The IFL did not materialize – the Pro Football Researchers Association attributed this failure to Europe not being ready for American football, potential competition with the World Football League (WFL), a players' strike during the summer of 1974, and the recession. Another factor was the turmoil in Europe in 1974: Turkey had invaded Cyprus, the American ambassador to Cyprus had been assassinated, Basque separatists had assassinated the prime minister of Spain, and terrorist groups like the Red Brigades had engaged in kidnapping. The State Department discouraged NFL Commissioner Pete Rozelle from pursuing the league, and the IFL also suffered a potentially fatal blow when Pan American World Airways, who Kap had brought on as a sponsor, pulled out of the project. Ultimately, Rozelle deemed the creation of the league "impractical".

By 1980, the popularity of American football was increasing in Europe without any push by the NFL. The NFL capitalized on this newfound interest by holding American Bowl games (pre-season exhibition contests held overseas), and the popularity of these games, particularly in London, led to a renewed interest from Rozelle in creating an American football league in Europe. In 1989, the NFL announced plans to create an international spring football league. The NFL initially wanted the new league to be known as the International Football League, but it had to change the name after discovering that the name was already owned by Donald Trump and Charley Finley, who were allegedly in the process of forming their own league (which would never come to fruition). The name World League of American Football (WLAF) was eventually settled on; this name was chosen to avoid associating it with the dissolved World Football League, and the term "American football" was included in the league's name because "football" in Europe typically refers to association football, known in the United States as soccer. The NFL and WLAF attempted to downplay its status as a minor league and refused to acknowledge the WLAF as a farm league of the NFL. The NFL approved the creation of the WLAF in July 1989, with Schramm to head up the project and the league expected to begin play in 1990 or 1991. The league was expected to have 12 teams (six in the United States, four in Europe, one in Canada and one in Mexico), and it secured a two-year television deal with ABC and a four-year television deal with USA Network to air regular and post-season games. Schramm was fired as league president in October 1990 due to differences between him and the NFL as to the direction the WLAF would take; Schramm had wanted the WLAF to be an "independent, major international league which would be strong enough to stand on its own feet", while the NFL had wanted the WLAF to be a small league with close ties to the NFL.

On November 14, 1990, the WLAF announced it would begin play in 1991 with ten teams (six of them in the United States, three of them in Europe, and one in Canada) split into three divisions (North America West, North America East, and Europe). A 50-game schedule stretching from March 23, 1991 to May 27, 1991 was agreed upon, and a draft was held from February 14, 1991 to February 24, 1991. Unlike the NFL draft, the World League draft was a position-by-position draft – potential draftees were divided into ten position groups, meaning each of the ten teams would have the number-one pick at a position group. All players were to receive a base salary of $20,000, but players could receive more money by meeting performance-based incentives with a maximum total salary of $100,000. Each NFL team could allocate up to four players to the WLAF, although only two, the New Orleans Saints and Kansas City Chiefs opted to do so.

WLAF (1991–92)

The World League of American Football, described by The New York Times as the "first trans-Atlantic major sports league", began play on March 23, 1991, with three games held in Frankfurt, Germany, Birmingham, Alabama, and Sacramento, California, respectively. After the conclusion of the regular season, the WLAF playoffs were held, featuring the three division champions (London Monarchs, New York/New Jersey Knights, and Birmingham Fire) and one wild-card team (Barcelona Dragons). London and Barcelona won their playoff games to meet in World Bowl '91 at Wembley Stadium, which London won 21–0.

Following its first season, the World League of American Football was at risk of folding. It suffered a loss of nearly $7 million, and none of its teams made a profit. In addition to the monetary loss for the league, television ratings on ABC and USA network were poor. According to Dan Rooney, the NFL chairman of the World League, cost estimates were accurate, but the league overestimated the amount of revenue the WLAF would make. The league's television contracts were also at risk due to poor ratings, with USA Network having lost money. The WLAF averaged around 26,000 fans a game in its first season; the European teams had a higher attendance than the North American teams, bolstering the average. Ultimately, the NFL decided to bring the league back for a second season in 1992. The league name was shortened to World League by league officials, who felt the surprising success of the league in Europe made the "American football" part unnecessary, and the Raleigh-Durham Skyhawks folded, replaced by the Ohio Glory.

NFL Europe/Europa (1995–2007)

Although the league was "wildly popular" in Europe, with attendance averaging 45,000 for the London Monarchs, it was "ignored" in the United States. The World League suspended play for the 1993 and 1994 season before returning in 1995 as a six-team, exclusively European league. All three of the original European teams returned along with three new teams (the Amsterdam Admirals, Rhein Fire, and Scottish Claymores). Each team was required to have seven "local" players on their 40-man roster. Fox became a co-owner of the WLAF and a major financial contributor in return for broadcasting rights. The league was renamed the NFL Europe League (NFLEL) in 1998, and the London Monarchs were renamed the England Monarchs in an attempt to spur attendance, which had fallen below 10,000 per game. The Monarchs would fold the following season and were replaced by the Berlin Thunder.

NFL Europe commemorated its 10th season in 2002, but still remained far from being profitable. The league announced a three-year with the soccer club FC Barcelona to jointly promote American football in Europe and soccer in the United States; the Barcelona Dragons franchise was renamed FC Barcelona Dragons. The collaboration with FC Barcelona would prove to be unsuccessful, however, and the Barcelona Dragons would fold after the 2003 season due to declining attendance. The team's attendance had fallen to under 7,000 per game, a 50% decline since the 1997 season, when the team had won the World Bowl. The Dragons were replaced by the Cologne Centurions in 2004, and the following year the Scottish Claymores folded; although the team boasted the largest following of any Scottish sports team outside the Old Firm, averaging 10,799 per game, the league had determined an additional German team could bring in 30,000 per game. 

The Claymores were replaced the following year by the Hamburg Sea Devils, which left the Amsterdam Admirals as the only team in the league not to be based in Germany. This was part of a strategic pivot to Germany, which had been the most receptive country to the league and the sport in general. Accordingly, the league changed its name to NFL Europa in 2006, ahead of the league's 15th season, to reflect the league's focus on Germany and the Netherlands.

Closure and legacy

On July 29, 2007, less than a week after World Bowl XV, the NFL announced the closure of NFL Europa. The league had been losing a reported US$30 million a year, and the NFL had decided to shift their strategy in marketing football abroad towards holding NFL regular-season games outside the United States. The NFL owners who funded the league were reportedly dissatisfied with NFL Europa's lack of revenue as well as its decreasing success in player development. The league had nearly folded in 2003, when eight of the 32 NFL owners voted against funding it, one short of the nine votes needed to end the league, and its gradual progression into a German-dominated league had ran counter to the NFL's goals of selling merchandise throughout the European continent. The league's inability to garner a live television contract with local media markets also played a role in its demise, as the potential revenue from a deal could have helped the league financially.

Andrei S. Markovits and Lars Rensmann described the league as an "abysmal failure", noting its poor quality of play, frequent name changes, and franchise relocations as well as the accessibility of regular NFL games in Europe as reasons for its collapse. Len Pasquarelli of ESPN.com noted that the league had strayed from its original goal, with the allocation system of players gradually being abused to amass training camp exemptions rather than to develop players. John Mara, the co-owner of the New York Giants, said that the league "had some useful purpose in developing players" and that it helped the NFL determine that there was an interest in American football in Europe.

Looking back on NFL Europe in 2017, Kevin Seifert of ESPN.com noted its strong record in developing quarterbacks: Kurt Warner (a Super Bowl champion and two-time MVP), Brad Johnson (who won a Super Bowl in 2002 with the Tampa Bay Buccaneers), Jake Delhomme (who led the Carolina Panthers to an NFC championship in 2003), and journeyman quarterback Jon Kitna all spent time in NFL Europe. Two NFL Europe alumni (kicker Adam Vinatieri and return specialist Dante Hall) were included on the NFL’s 2000s All-Decade Team. The league also provided an opportunity for the NFL to experiment with rules and to develop officials and coaches. Some NFL coaches and executives have suggested reviving the concept of a developmental league, and several independent leagues have been created to fill the need, but with little success. At a press conference before Super Bowl LI, league commissioner Roger Goodell said the NFL had been "actively considering" creating a new developmental league.

Since the closure of NFL Europa, the NFL has held regular-season games annually in London and has also hosted regular-season games in Mexico City and Toronto. The league is pursuing the goal of a franchise in London, as well as potential regular-season games in China. In 2021, the NFL announced its was looking for partners to host a regular-season game in Germany. In 2022, the league announced four regular-season games would be held in Germany, the first set for November 13, 2022 between the Tampa Bay Buccaneers and Seattle Seahawks to be played at Munich's Allianz Arena. NFL.com writer Judy Battista noted Germany was the "fastest-growing international community" for the league, and attributed this in part to the popularity of the former NFL Europe's German teams, but argued the large number of expats as well as the American military presence were greater factors.

In 2007, fans and former members of the Frankfurt Galaxy – the most successful of NFL Europe's teams on the field and in crowd attendance – created the Frankfurt Universe. The new team was promoted to the German Football League 2 in 2011, and won promotion to the German Football League (GFL) in 2015. The European League of Football (ELF), a pan-European league that began play in 2021, signed an agreement with the NFL allowing them to utilize the branding of the former teams of NFL Europe. The ELF's Barcelona Dragons, Berlin Thunder, Cologne Centurions, Hamburg Sea Devils, Frankfurt Galaxy, and Rhein Fire all share the names and imagery of their NFL Europe predecessors.

Season structure and development
This chart demonstrates the league’s table for the 2007 season. From 1998 to 2007, each team played 10 games (a home and away game against every other team in the league), and the top two teams at the end of the season (highlighted in green) qualified for the championship game, the World Bowl. The Hamburg Sea Devils won the game 37–28, securing the league’s championship.

From 1991–92, the 12-team WLAF was split into three divisions: North America East, North America West, and Europe with a ten-game regular season schedule. All three division champions, in addition to the team with the best record who didn't win a division, made the playoffs. The winners of the two playoff games played for the league championship in the World Bowl. The ten game schedule was retained upon the league's return in 1995, but was modified with the new six-team format. Each team played every other team twice in a double round-robin regular season. Following the regular season, two teams would be selected for the World Bowl; the team that led the league's standings after week five would host the game, and the team with the best overall record at the end of the season would be their opponent. This format was criticized for making the second half of the league's season less competitive, and beginning with the 1998 season it was changed to have the two teams with the best overall records play in the World Bowl instead.

The league played under standard NFL rules, with several exceptions. In an effort to appeal to fans of rugby and soccer, the league instituted rules to speed up the pace of the game and awarded four points for field goals made from beyond 50 yards as opposed to the typical three points. Rule changes instituted upon the league's revival in 1995 included the creation of the defensive two-point conversion, referred to by the league as the "deuce", as well as only requiring receivers to have one foot in bounds on a completed pass. The regular-season overtime period consisted of a single 10-minute quarter where both teams were required to have control of the ball at least once, and the play clock was set to 35 seconds. Starting with the 1997 season, the league required the receiver to have two feet in bounds for a completed pass. Ties were possible in the league, with two (a 1992 game between the London Monarchs and Birmingham Fire and a 2006 game between the Berlin Thunder and Hamburg Sea Devils) occurring in league history.

NFL teams were allowed to allocate players to NFL Europe. In exchange for doing this, they were awarded with exemptions for training camp, allowing them to bring more players than would otherwise be allowed. A certain number of players on each team of NFL Europe were required to be "local players", and at least two local players were required to be on the field at all times during games. Despite this, most of the league's most prominent players were Americans; "local players" were often converted rugby or soccer players playing as punters or placekickers.

Teams

World League of American Football/World League (1991–92)

World League/NFL Europe League/NFL Europa (1995–2007)

Trophy and awards
NFL Europe presented several awards and honors. The World Bowl trophy, awarded to the winners of the annual World Bowl game, was a 40-pound glass globe. The winning team also received championship rings Other awards included regular season most valuable player awards on offense and defense, a coach of the year award, and an award for the World Bowl MVP. The league also awarded offensive, defensive, special teams, and national players of the week, and named an all-league team at the end of the season.

Award winners

Television coverage

1991–92
In the United States, television coverage was provided by the ABC and USA Network. The reported cost of the contracts varied. According to the Los Angeles Times, ABC committed to $28 million over two years, and USA Network committed to $25 million for the same length of time with an additional two-year option. Ratings were characterized as "poor" in the inaugural season, with ABC averaging a 2.1 rating and USA Network averaging a 1.2 rating. Television ratings in the United States were "dismal" during the league's second season, with ABC averaging a 1.7 rating and USA Network averaging a 1.1 rating. As a result, ABC's payment was reduced to $3 million while USA saw theirs lowered to $10 million. According to The New York Times, USA Network was "not happy" with this arrangement and did not heavily promote the league as a result.

International teams aired on different domestic networks. Montreal Machine games were aired in English on The Sports Network and in French on RDS. Coverage in Europe was mostly on satellite television. Eurosport showed games on delay and Super Channel aired the 1991 World Bowl. In the United Kingdom, Channel 4 showed half-hour highlights of Monarchs games on Saturday mornings. Larry Eichel of the Philadelphia Inquirer wrote that "The only way a Monarchs fan could watch the team's first-round playoff game from the Meadowlands was to go to Wembley to see it on closed circuit."

1995–2007
The revived league's United Kingdom television coverage was mainly on Sky Sports, with additional coverage also on Channel 4, STV, and Carlton. Eight European continental broadcasters also showed games, including Germany's Vox and DSF.

Although the league no longer had any U.S. teams, it was covered on American television until its closure. Fox became a co-owner of the league in exchange for broadcasting rights, and following the relaunch all regular season games were broadcast on the FX network. Fox ended its joint ownership with the league in 2000, but continued to air some games as a television partner. In 2004, NFL Network began airing select NFL Europe games. This was expanded to cover all NFL Europe games – including the World Bowl – in 2006.

Records

Champions and runners-up

Win–loss records

References

External links

 Historical site index for WLAF and NFL Europe/Europa
 MacGille's World League of American Football website

 
NFL Europe
Defunct American football leagues
Sports leagues established in 1991
Sports leagues disestablished in 2007
World League Of American Football
World League Of American Football
World League Of American Football
Fox Sports original programming
FX Networks original programming
NFL Network original programming
1991 establishments in Europe
2007 disestablishments in Europe
1991 establishments in Canada
1993 disestablishments in Canada
1991 establishments in the United States
1993 disestablishments in the United States